Citharichthys gilberti, the bigmouth sanddab, is a species of flatfish in the large-tooth flounder family Paralichthyidae. It is native to the eastern Pacific Ocean, in tropical waters ranging from the Gulf of California in the north to Peru in the south.

This demersal fish inhabits the soft bottoms of trawling grounds and bays. It is commonly found in estuaries and can also venture into freshwater.

Like the rest of the large-tooth flounders, it has both eyes on the left side of its head. Citharichthys gilberti is a predator, feeding on large benthic organisms and small fish. It is a commercial fish of minor importance.

References

Citharichthys
Fauna of the Baja California Peninsula
Western Central American coastal fauna
Fish of Colombia
Fish of Ecuador
Fish described in 1889
Taxa named by Oliver Peebles Jenkins